The Savannah Sand Gnats were a minor league baseball team based in Savannah, Georgia. They were a member of the A-level South Atlantic League. The Sand Gnats were an affiliate of the New York Mets in their final nine seasons. The team relocated to Columbia, South Carolina, in 2016 where they are now known as the Columbia Fireflies.

History
Formerly known as the Savannah Cardinals, the team played their inaugural season in 1984, affiliated with the St. Louis Cardinals. In 1996, the team changed its name to the Sand Gnats, and became an affiliate of the Los Angeles Dodgers. The team was affiliated with the Texas Rangers from 1998 to 2002 and the Montreal Expos/Washington Nationals from 2003 to 2006.

The Sand Gnats played their home games at Grayson Stadium. Opened in 1927, Grayson Stadium seated 4,700 fans during its time as the home of the Sand Gnats. The Sand Gnats won four SAL championships (1993, 1994, 1996, 2013).

On January 11, 2007, the Sand Gnats named Tim Teufel as manager for the 2007 season.

On May 8, 2007, Jorge Reyes, a pitcher for the Sand Gnats, was suspended for violating Minor League Baseball's substance abuse policy. Reyes was the first player to receive a 100-game suspension for his second violation.

On March 20, 2008, Atlanta-based Hardball Capital purchased the Savannah Sand Gnats.

Among their notable alumni are Adrián Beltré, Jacob DeGrom, Éric Gagné, Edwin Encarnación, Michael Fulmer, Travis Hafner, Hank Blalock, Steven Matz, Collin McHugh, Brandon Nimmo, Josh Whitesell, Josh Satin, and Ryan Zimmerman.

Season-by-season records

|-
| 1984 || 78 || 61 || 3rd, Southern || Lost in Semi-Finals
|-
| 1985 || 57 || 78 || 4th, Southern || Did Not Qualify
|-
| 1986 || 75 || 60 || 2nd, Southern || Did Not Qualify
|-
| 1987 || 69 || 69 || 4th, Southern || Did Not Qualify
|-
| 1988 || 68 || 67 || 5th, Southern || Did Not Qualify
|-
| 1989 || 69 || 70 || 4th, Southern || Did Not Qualify
|-
| 1990 || 73 || 68 || 6th, Southern || Lost League Finals
|-
| 1991 || 61 || 77 || 7th, Southern || Did Not Qualify
|-
| 1992 || 62 || 78 || 5th, Southern || Did Not Qualify
|-
| 1993 || 94 || 48 || 1st, Southern || League Champions
|-
| 1994 || 82 || 55 || 2nd, Southern || League Champions
|-
| 1995 || 56 || 83 || 6th, Southern || Did Not Qualify
|-
| 1996 || 72 || 69 || 2nd, Southern || League Champions
|-
| 1997 || 63 || 77 || 3rd, Southern || Did Not Qualify
|-
| 1998 || 66 || 76 || 3rd, Southern || Did Not Qualify
|-
| 1999 || 62 || 78 || 4th, Southern || Did Not Qualify
|-
| 2000 || 74 || 65 || 4th, Southern || Did Not Qualify
|-
| 2001 || 54 || 82 || 8th, Southern || Did Not Qualify
|-
| 2002 || 49 || 89 || 8th, Southern || Did Not Qualify
|-
| 2003 || 58 || 80 || 7th, Southern || Did Not Qualify
|-
| 2004 || 58 || 80 || 7th, Southern || Did Not Qualify
|-
| 2005 || 62 || 76 || 7th, Southern || Did Not Qualify
|-
| 2006 || 56 || 83 || 7th, Southern || Did Not Qualify
|-
| 2007 || 41 || 94 || 8th, Southern || Did Not Qualify
|-
| 2008 || 61 || 76 || 7th, Southern || Did Not Qualify
|-
| 2009 || 65 || 72 || Southern || Did Not Qualify
|-
||2010 || 75 || 64 || Southern || Lost in Semi-Finals
|-
||2011 || 79 || 60 || Southern || Lost League Finals
|-
||2012 || 69 || 67 || Southern || Did Not Qualify
|-
||2013 || 77 || 61 || Southern || League Champions
|-
||2014 || 85 || 51 || Southern || Lost in Semi-Finals
|-
||2015 || 83 || 54 || 1st, Southern || Lost in League Finals

Rivals

Augusta GreenJackets

The Sand Gnats had a in-state rivalry with the Augusta GreenJackets, an affiliate of the San Francisco Giants.

Charleston RiverDogs

The Sand Gnats had a rivalry with the Charleston RiverDogs, an affiliate of the New York Yankees.

References

Baseball teams established in 1984
Baseball teams disestablished in 2015
Defunct South Atlantic League teams
Baseball teams in Savannah, Georgia
Professional baseball teams in Georgia (U.S. state)
Montreal Expos minor league affiliates
New York Mets minor league affiliates
Los Angeles Dodgers minor league affiliates
St. Louis Cardinals minor league affiliates
Texas Rangers minor league affiliates
Washington Nationals minor league affiliates
1984 establishments in Georgia (U.S. state)
2015 disestablishments in Georgia (U.S. state)
Defunct baseball teams in Georgia